Kalateh-ye Marvi (also Romanized as Kalāteh-ye Marvī; also known as Mowrī) is a village in Mian Jam Rural District, in the Central District of Torbat-e Jam County, Razavi Khorasan Province, Iran. At the 2006 census, its population was 967, in 200 families.

References 

Populated places in Torbat-e Jam County